Tommy Anthony Fletcher (born 22 January 1995) is an English professional footballer who plays as a defender for Welwyn Garden City.

Career
Fletcher began his career with non-league Cheshunt and in July 2013 signed for Football League side Wycombe Wanderers after a successful trial. He made his professional debut on 3 September 2013 in a 2–0 victory over Exeter City in the Football League Trophy.

Fletcher signed a new year long contract on 30 May 2014.

After a spell on loan at Bishop's Stortford during the 2013–14 season, Fletcher signed a three-month loan deal at Southern Football League Premier Division side Chesham United in August 2014.

In 2020, Fletcher signed for Walthamstow following spells at Hertford Town and Tring Athletic. In October 2022, the in-demand Fletcher signed for Welwyn Garden City.

References

External links

1995 births
Living people
English footballers
Association football defenders
Cheshunt F.C. players
Wycombe Wanderers F.C. players
Bishop's Stortford F.C. players
Chesham United F.C. players
Hertford Town F.C. players
Tring Athletic F.C. players
Walthamstow F.C. players
Welwyn Garden City F.C. players
National League (English football) players
Southern Football League players